Huang Jing (born 24 November 1985) is a Chinese basketball player for Shanghai Swordfish and the Chinese national team, where she participated at the 2014 FIBA World Championship.

References

1985 births
Living people
Chinese women's basketball players
Power forwards (basketball)
Small forwards
Shanghai Swordfish players